Giuliani is an Italian family name, which can refer to:

 Carlo Giuliani, who died during the demonstrations against 2001 G8
 Carlo Giuliani (bishop), died 1663, bishop of Ston
 François Giuliani, (1938–2009) Algerian journalist and publicist
 Gilda Giuliani, Italian singer
 Laura Giuliani, Italian football goalkeeper
 Luca Giuliani, professor at the Humboldt University, specialising in Greek and Roman archaeology
 Lui Giuliani, Australian businessman
 Mauro Giuliani, guitarist and composer
 Reginaldo Giuliani, better known as Father Giuliani, Dominican friar, soldier and Italian writer
 Rudy Giuliani, former mayor of New York City and former candidate for United States president in 2008
 Regina Peruggi Giuliani, his first wife, American educator
 Donna Hanover Giuliani, his second wife
 Judith Giuliani, his third wife
 Andrew Giuliani, his son; American Special Assistant to President Trump.
 Caroline Giuliani, his daughter; American filmmaker, political activist, and writer
 Simone Giuliani, Italian musician, composer, arranger and record producer 
 Stefano Giuliani, former Italian professional cyclist
 Tony Giuliani, catcher in Major League Baseball from 1936 to 1943
 Veronica Giuliani, mystic and saint

See also
 Giuliani (turkey), the tame wild turkey that lives in Riverside Park, Manhattan, New York City, named for the former mayor
 Giuliani Partners, a company founded by Rudolph Giuliani and its former subsidiary Giuliani Capital Advisors

Italian-language surnames
Patronymic surnames
Surnames from given names
Surnames of South Tyrolean origin